Biedrzykowice  is a village in the administrative district of Gmina Działoszyce, within Pińczów County, Świętokrzyskie Voivodeship, in south-central Poland.

The village has a population of 123.

References

Biedrzykowice